Don Whitford (born 15 November 1956) is a former Australian rules footballer who played with Fitzroy and Melbourne in the Victorian Football League (VFL).

Notes

External links 

1956 births
Living people
Australian rules footballers from Victoria (Australia)
Fitzroy Football Club players
Melbourne Football Club players